Sânpetru de Câmpie is a commune in Mureș County, Transylvania, Romania that is composed of six villages: Bârlibaș (Barlabás), Dâmbu (Meződomb), Satu Nou (Strinatanya), Sângeorgiu de Câmpie (Uzdiszentgyörgy), Sânpetru de Câmpie and Tușinu (Tuson). It has a population of 3,044: 81.4% Romanians, 11.85% Roma and 6.73% Hungarians.

References

Communes in Mureș County
Localities in Transylvania